{{Infobox artist
| name             = Suppapong Udomkaewkanjana
| native_name      = 
| birth_date       = 
| birth_place      = Trat, Thailand
| notable_works    = {{ubl|Pete Pitchaya in Love By Chance (2018) |Aof Issawa in Let’s Fight Ghost (Thai Version) (2021) }}
| education        = Srinakharinwirot University (Faculty of Economics)
| image            = Suppapong Udomkaewkanjana @ EMFierceFashionEP3.png
}}
Suppapong Udomkaewkanjana (born 17 April 1998), nicknamed Saint, is a Thai actor, producer and host. He gained fame through his role as Pete (Pichaya) in the 2018 TV series Love by Chance''.

Early life and education 
Suppapong was born on 17 April 1998 in Trat, Thailand. He was given the Chinese name Huang Mingming by his great-grandfather. He graduated from Tradtragarnkun School, Trat Province and Assumption College, Bangkok. He holds a degree in economics from the Srinakharinwirot University.

In childhood, He started activities for the benefit of the public since grade 4. During his studies from high school to university, he participated in various volunteer camps. Until in 2017, he received the Person of the Siam Award in the outstanding youth for society category.

Career 
Saint made his acting debut in 2018 with the Thai BL series Love by Chance playing the lead role of Pete (Pitchaya) alongside Tanapon Sukumpantanasan in the role of Ae (Intouch). His performance gained him widespread fame in East and Southeast Asia and parts of Europe, America, and Latin America.

On 14 July 2019, he released his debut single “I crush on you” as a gift to his fan club, which he jointly invested and co-produced. During that same year, he became a member of the boy group KissBoysTH in which he is one of 5 total members. This project aims to producing music and variety programs.

In early 2020, he played the lead role of Tutor (Sattakhun) in Why R U?:The Series alongside Pruk Panich in the role of Fighter (Pipakron). He was also cast as the lead role of Aof (Issawa) in the series Let's Fight Ghost (Thailand) alongside Patchanan Jiajirachote in the role of Jean (Jidapa). which was scheduled to air in late 2020. However, due to nationwide measures set in place to avoid the spread of COVID-19 Let's Fight Ghost (Thailand)'s broadcasting schedule has been postponed until 2021.

In 2020, he started his business with the popcorn dessert business It aims to promote the economy in the community. And established the Idol Factory Co., Ltd. for producing television programs on April 24, 2020.

On December 24, 2020, Saint starred in a movie Von The (Begging you) alongside Phiravich Attachitsataporn, Peemapol Panichtamrong and Sarika Sathsilpsupa.

In 2021, He was cast as the lead role in the series Sing Again (Thailand) which was scheduled to air in late 2021

Filmography

Executive Producer

Cine

Television series

Music video

Discography

Master of Ceremony: MC

Television

Online

Awards and nominations

References

External links 

1998 births
Living people
Suppapong Udomkaewkanjana
Suppapong Udomkaewkanjana
Suppapong Udomkaewkanjana
Suppapong Udomkaewkanjana
Suppapong Udomkaewkanjana
Suppapong Udomkaewkanjana
Suppapong Udomkaewkanjana
Suppapong Udomkaewkanjana
Suppapong Udomkaewkanjana
Suppapong Udomkaewkanjana
Suppapong Udomkaewkanjana